Breath of Life is an album led by drummer Louis Hayes which was recorded in 1974 and released on the Muse label.

Track listing 
 "Brothers and Sisters" (Tex Allen) – 9:12
 "Breath of Life" (Charles Davis) – 5:07
 "Olea" (Davis) – 5:41
 "Purely Unintentional" (Louis Hayes) – 8:44
 "Bongolo" (Hayes) – 3:28 
 "Kong's Dance" (Allen) – 9:26

Personnel 
Louis Hayes – drums
Tex Allen – trumpet, flugelhorn
Gerald Hayes – alto saxophone
Charles Davis – baritone saxophone, soprano saxophone
Ronnie Mathews – piano
David Williams – bass
Toot Monk – congas, percussion

References 

Louis Hayes albums
1974 albums
Muse Records albums
Albums produced by Don Schlitten